Events from the year 1511 in India.

Events
 23 November Mahmud Begada's rule of Gujarat Sultanate ends with his death (began 1498)

Births
 Bega Begum later empress of the Mughal Empire is born (dies 1582)

Deaths
 23 November Mahmud Begada dies  
 Yusuf Adil Shah founder of the Adil Shahi dynasty (although he may have died at the end of 1510) (born 1459)

See also
 Timeline of Indian history

References

 
India